An orderly is a hospital attendant whose job consists of assisting medical staff with various medical interventions.

Orderly may also refer to:

 Batman (military), also known as an orderly—a soldier or airman assigned to a commissioned officer as a personal servant
 In the United States Air Force, the title of Bay Orderly refers to airmen temporarily assigned to help clean and maintain the community areas of the dormitories during the duty day.

Film and TV
 The Orderly, a 1918 American film
 The Orderly (1933 film)
 The Orderly (1961 film), an Italian film starring Vittorio De Sica
The Orderlies, fictional hexagonal-mouthed humanoids with grilled mouths who serve the Shakri in the Doctor Who episode The Power of Three.

See also